Paddy Doyle is an English athlete. The 2009 edition of the Guinness Book of World Records recognised him as "The World Fitness Endurance Champion".

Personal history
Doyle was a member of the British Parachute Regiment and was discharged in 1986. Doyle has 49 entries and re-entries in the 1990–2008 Guinness Book of World Records.

Records
 World Fitness Endurance Champion, 2009
 1,500,230 press-ups in one year
 716 step ups in an hour, 2006
 World's fittest man, 2004

References

Year of birth missing (living people)
Living people
British sportspeople
British Parachute Regiment soldiers